The  is a high-speed shinkansen train service jointly operated by East Japan Railway Company (JR East) and West Japan Railway Company (JR West) between  and  on the Hokuriku Shinkansen line in Japan. The shinkansen service was introduced on 14 March 2015, but the name was first used for a limited express service operated by Japanese National Railways (JNR) from 1965 until 1982, and later by JR West and Hokuetsu Express between 1997 and March 2015.

Service outline

Hakutaka services stop at the following stations. Not all trains stop at stations marked with an asterisk.
 
 
 
 
 *
 *
 *
 
 *

Rolling stock
 E7 series 12-car sets based at Nagano Depot, since 14 March 2015
 W7 series 12-car sets based at Hakusan Depot, since 14 March 2015

Hakutaka services are operated using JR East E7 series and JR West W7 series 12-car train sets based at Nagano and Hakusan depots respectively.

Pre-shinkansen
 485 series EMUs
 681 series EMUs owned by JR West
 681-2000 series EMUs owned by Hokuetsu Express
 683-8000 series EMUs owned by Hokuetsu Express

Limited express services from March 1997 until March 2015 were operated with 6- or 9-car (6+3-car) 681 series or 683-8000 series EMU trains owned by JR West or Hokuetsu Express. Green (first class) car accommodation was provided in car 1.

Formations
Hakutaka shinkansen services use 12-car JR East E7 series and JR West W7 series trainsets, formed as follows, with car 1 at the Tokyo (southern) end. Cars 1 to 10 are ordinary-class cars with 2+3 seating, car 11 is a "Green" car with 2+2 seating, and car 12 is a "Gran Class" car with 2+1 seating. All cars are no-smoking.

History

October 1965 – November 1982
This was discontinued from 15 November 1982.

March 1997 – March 2015

Hakutaka services operated at approximately hourly intervals between Kanazawa and Echigo-Yuzawa, with one return service daily starting and terminating at Fukui. Services stopped at the following stations.

() –  –  –  –  –  –  – 

The last Hakutaka limited express service ran on 13 March 2015, replaced by new high-speed shinkansen services from the start of the revised timetable introduced the following day.

Shinkansen Hakutaka, (March 2015 – )
From 14 March 2015, the name Hakutaka was transferred to new shinkansen services operating between Tokyo and Kanazawa following the opening of the Hokuriku Shinkansen beyond Nagano.

See also
 List of named passenger trains of Japan

References

External links

 JR West Hakutaka train information 

Named passenger trains of Japan
East Japan Railway Company
West Japan Railway Company
Railway services introduced in 1965
1965 establishments in Japan
Railway services introduced in 2015
2015 establishments in Japan
Named Shinkansen trains